Ashbridge's Creek was a watercourse that flowed in Ashbridge's Bay, between the Don River and Highland Creek.

The creek was buried, and converted to a sewer, in 1909, together with nearby Smalls Creek, and Tomlin's Creek, shortly after their communities they ran through were annexed by the growing city of Toronto.

Portions of a fence the Ashbridge family erected along the creek, to keep their cattle from polluting it, survive to the present day, near Craven Road.

References

External links

Rivers of Toronto